Fountain Hills High School is a public high school in Fountain Hills, Arizona under the jurisdiction of the Fountain Hills Unified School District.

Fountain Hills High School was constructed from 1991 to 1993, and its first graduating class was in 1994. It is located next to the local Golden Eagle Park, south of the Ashbrook Wash. Fountain Hills High School has many extracurricular programs, including a first-place band and many champion-winning athletic teams. Clubs include robotics, key vlub, National Honor Society, student government, jazz band, and astronomy. There is a wide variety of AP & honors classes, an AVID program, an elaborate art department and much more. Fountain Hills is seeing a gradual increase in students from Scottsdale due to the small and inclusive appeal Fountain Hills High School offers compared to surrounding schools.

The Fountain Hills High School marching band won 1st place at the ABODA (Arizona Band and Orchestra Directors Association) Super State Finals competition at Arizona State University's Sun Devil Stadium in Tempe, Arizona.

The Fountain Hills High School symphonic band performs locally at the Fountain Hills Community Center semiannually at the end of the second and fourth academic quarters. All members of the marching band automatically convert into symphonic band students at the conclusion of the marching band season. The symphonic band competes alongside the jazz band during the annual band & choir California spring trip.

The Fountain Hills High School falcon jazz band is classified as a school club, and meets biweekly for rehearsals. The jazz band competes alongside the symphonic band during the annual band & choir California spring trip.

External Links
 Fountain Hills High School website
Public high schools in Arizona
Educational institutions established in 1991
Schools in Maricopa County, Arizona
Fountain Hills, Arizona
1991 establishments in Arizona